Polyakov is the name of several rural localities in Russia:
Polyakov, Rostov Oblast, a khutor in Verkhneoblivskoye Rural Settlement of Tatsinsky District in Rostov Oblast; 
Polyakov, Samara Oblast, a settlement in Bolshechernigovsky District of Samara Oblast
Polyakov, Saratov Oblast, a khutor in Tatishchevsky District of Saratov Oblast